KRWI (98.1 FM) is a radio station licensed to serve the community of Wofford Heights, California. The station is owned by Rubin Broadcasting, Inc., and airs a '90s and '00s hits format.

The station was assigned the call sign KTOX-FM by the Federal Communications Commission on December 10, 2015. The station changed its call sign to KRWI on October 30, 2018. The call sign change preceded the station flipping its format on November 1, 2018, from alternative "Toxic 98.1".

References

External links
 Official Website
 

RWI (FM)
Radio stations established in 2017
2017 establishments in California
Adult hits radio stations in the United States
Mass media in Kern County, California